Ramiyah's self-titled debut album was released in 2004.

Track listing
 "Intro" (spoken)
 "Here We Go (Holla)"
 "Just Stop"
 "The Reason"
 "Turn It Out" (remix)
 "I Told You"
 "Power from God"
 "Don't Nobody Know"
 "Interlude"
 "Waiting"
 "Don't Look Any Further"
 "Things We Want"
 "Covered"
 "Interlude" (spoken)
 "You Never Left Me"
 "Interlude" (spoken)
 "Turn It Out"

Ramiyah albums
2003 albums